Quinton Armani Gardner (born May 10, 1996), professionally known as Pressa, is a rapper and singer from Toronto.

Early life 
Quinton Armani Gardner was born  on May 10, 1996, in Toronto, Ontario to a Filipino mother and a Jamaican father. He was five weeks old when his father was sentenced to 15 years in prison for second-degree murder, which left his mother to care for him and his older brother. He grew up in an area known as Driftwood in the Jane and Finch neighbourhood of Toronto.

Career

2016–2018 
Gardner rose to prominence after the release of his hit single "Novacane", which was produced by frequent collaborator Murda Beatz. In 2017, he opened for Drake on his Boy Meets World Tour despite being on bail for kidnapping allegations, and was featured in 6ix Rising, a Canadian documentary film about the hip hop culture in Canada. Later that year, he gained significant attention for his unique flow on his single "Canada Goose" featuring Tory Lanez, which was released in December. Pressa has also worked with overseas artists including British rapper Giggs, releasing the single "Sexy" in April 2017, and he was featured in K Koke's single "D Ting Set" in the same year. In October 2018, Pressa released the single "420 in London" featuring Lil Uzi Vert. He was featured on the song "Up & Down" by 6ixBuzz alongside Houdini, which amassed over 1 million views on YouTube within the 1st month of release.

2019–present 
In 2019, Gardner released Prestige, an album named after his father, which debuted at the number 1 spot on the iTunes Canada hip hop music charts. It featured appearances from Burna Bandz as well as Lil Richie. Pressa collaborated with British rapper Russ and Taze on the single "Vida Loca", released in July 2019. Pressa's latest single, "O.T.M. (Out The Mud)", was released on February 7, 2020, via WorldStarHipHop.

In May 2020, he signed with Sony Music Canada, in conjunction with Blue Feathers Records, coinciding with his release of his single "96 Freestyle".

Personal life 
As of 2019, Gardner is currently living in Los Angeles, California, having been relocated from Toronto. In April 2021, he began a relationship with Coi Leray another rising artist known as the daughter of Hip Hop mogul & former CEO of The Source Magazine Benzino.

Discography

Studio albums 
 2019: Prestige
 2021: Gardner Express (Deluxe)

Mixtapes 
 2017: Press Machine
 2017: Press a Brick

Extended plays 
 2020: Gardner Express

Compilation albums 
 2018: Northside Jane (by UpTop Movement Inc.)
 2018: 6ixUpsideDown (by 6ixBuzz)
 2019: NorthernSound (by 6ixBuzz)
 2021: Canada's Most Wanted (by 6ixbuzz)

Guest appearances

Awards and Nominations 

|-
| 2022
| "Attachments" (feat. Taliban Glizzy)
| Juno Award for Rap Single of the Year
| 
|}

Filmography

References 

Living people
1996 births
Black Canadian musicians
Canadian male rappers
21st-century Canadian rappers
Canadian people of Jamaican descent
Canadian musicians of Filipino descent
21st-century Canadian male musicians
Rappers from Toronto